Davanagere Lok Sabha constituency is one of 28 Lok Sabha constituencies in Karnataka state in southern India. This constituency was created in 1977 after the reorganisation of Indian states.

Assembly segments
Davanagere Lok Sabha constituency comprises the following eight legislative assembly segments:

Members of Parliament

Election results

See also
 Davanagere district
 List of Constituencies of the Lok Sabha

References 

Election Commission of India https://web.archive.org/web/20081218010942/http://www.eci.gov.in/StatisticalReports/ElectionStatistics.asp
http://results.eci.gov.in/pc/en/constituencywise/ConstituencywiseS1013.htm?ac=13

Lok Sabha constituencies in Karnataka
Davanagere district
Davangere